Czechowicz is a surname of Polish-language origin, meaning "son of the Czech". It is related to Belarusian Chakhovich or Čachovič, Ukrainian Chekhovych, and Russian Chekhovich. Notable people with the surname include:
Gabriel Czechowicz (1876–1938), Polish lawyer, economist and politician
Józef Czechowicz (1903-1939), Polish poet 
Juliusz Czechowicz (1894-1974), Polish painter
Mieczysław Czechowicz (1930–1991), Polish actor
Szymon Czechowicz (1689–1775), Polish painter of the Baroque

Polish-language surnames
Ethnonymic surnames